Santa Clara University College of Arts & Sciences is a private academic institution at Santa Clara University. It is the largest of the professional schools at Santa Clara University.

Academics
The College of Arts and Sciences at Santa Clara University offers degree programs in the arts, humanities, natural sciences, and social sciences, with interdisciplinary and cross-disciplinary options. As the home of the Core Curriculum, the College serves roughly 5,300 undergraduate students, 2,900 of whom are students within the College.

Made up of 27 departments and programs, the College offers 33 majors and 40 minors for undergraduate students and an M.A. in Pastoral Ministries for graduate students. It serves as the home of the Center for the Arts and Humanities and offers programming through various initiatives, including the Sinatra Chair in the Performing Arts, the Digital Humanities Initiative, and the DeNardo Lectureship in the Health Sciences.

Majors

 Anthropology
 Art History
 Biochemistry
 Biology
 Chemistry
 Child Studies
 Classical Studies
 Communication
 Computer Science
 Economics
 Engineering Physics
 English
 Environmental Science
 Environmental Studies
 Ethnic Studies
 History
 Individual Studies
 Mathematics
 Modern Languages: French
 Modern Languages: Italian
 Modern Languages: Spanish
 Music
 Neuroscience
 Philosophy
 Physics
 Political Science
 Psychology
 Public Health Science
 Religious Studies
 Sociology
 Studio Art
 Theatre and Dance
 Women's and Gender Studies

Minors

 Anthropology
 Arabic, Islamic and Middle Eastern Studies
 Art History
 Asian Studies
 Biology
 Biotechnology
 Catholic Studies
 Chemistry
 Classical Studies
 Communication
 Computer Science
 Creative Writing
 Dance
 Economics
 English
 Environmental Studies
 Ethnic Studies
 History
 Latin American Studies
 Mathematics
 Medieval & Renaissance Studies
 Modern Languages: French
 Modern Languages: Italian
 Modern Languages: Japanese
 Modern Languages: Spanish
 Music
 Musical Theatre
 Philosophy
 Physics
 Political Science
 Professional Writing
 Public Health Science
 Religious Studies
 Sociology
 Studio Art
 Sustainability
 Theatre
 Theatre Design & Technology
 Urban Education
 Women's & Gender Studies

References

External links 

Santa Clara University Schools and Colleges
Educational institutions established in 1851
University subdivisions in California
1851 establishments in California